The 1790s in Western fashion are split between:

 1775–1795 in Western fashion
 1795–1820 in Western fashion